Katharina Focke (8 October 1922 – 10 July 2016) was a German politician of the Social Democratic Party of Germany (SPD). She served as Federal Minister of Family Affairs, Senior Citizens, Women and Youth from 1972 to 1976.

Biography
Focke studied Economics at the University of Zürich and studied English, German, and History at the University of Hamburg. She studied political science at the University of Oklahoma and received a Ph.D. in 1954. She joined the Social Democrats in 1964 and was elected two years later to the Düsseldorf parliament. She was elected to the Bundestag in 1969. Chancellor Willy Brandt selected her to be the Parliamentary Secretary to the Chancellery, where she also dealt with European issues.

In 1972 Focke was put in charge of the Federal Ministry for Youth, Family and Health, a position she held for four years. In the Bundestag, she served from 1969 to 1980. From 1980 until 1989 Focke served at the European Parliament. She lived in Cologne after her retirement and died on 10 July 2016, aged 93.

References

1922 births
2016 deaths
Politicians from Bonn
20th-century women MEPs for Germany
Social Democratic Party of Germany MEPs
Grand Crosses with Star and Sash of the Order of Merit of the Federal Republic of Germany
MEPs for Germany 1979–1984
MEPs for Germany 1984–1989
University of Hamburg alumni
Federal government ministers of Germany
Women federal government ministers of Germany